KCYK (1400 AM, "Outlaw Country 1400") is a radio station broadcasting a classic country music format. Licensed to serve the community of Yuma, Arizona, United States, the station is currently owned by MonsterMedia, LLC in Yuma.

Programming
KCYK's programming includes local news and weather with Jennifer Blackwell, classic country programming, and live games of the Arizona Diamondbacks.  AP News coverage is provided at the top of each hour.

History
On December 14, 1950, radio station KYMA began broadcasting at 1400 kHz AM with 250 watts of power as a Mutual/Don Lee network affiliate. It was later an NBC Radio affiliate for the Imperial Valley until the early 1970s. The station changed its call sign to KVOY in January 1957, then to KIVY in 1972, then to KEZC in May 1984, to KJOK in January 1997, and to KCYK in November 2009.

Current owner Keith Lewis acquired KEZC and KJOK-FM in 1997. KJOK became KLJZ in 1997.

The KYMA call letters were revived in Yuma as a television station in 1987.

References

External links
FCC History Cards for KCYK

CYK
Classic country radio stations in the United States